Richard Raymond (died 1417/1418), of Devon, was an English politician.

Family
Raymond was the son of the MP, Thomas Raymond.

Career
He was a Member (MP) of the Parliament of England for Exeter in 1410.

References

14th-century births
1418 deaths
English MPs 1410
Members of the Parliament of England (pre-1707) for Exeter